The athletics competition at the 2019 Games of the Small States of Europe was held at the Stadion Topolica in Bar from 29 to 31 May 2019.

Medal table

Medalists

Men

Women

Men's results

100 metres

Heats – 29 MayWind:Heat 1: -1.0 m/s, Heat 2: -1.4 m/s

Final – 29 MayWind:+0.0 m/s

200 metres

Heats – 30 MayWind:Heat 1: +0.0 m/s, Heat 2: +1.2 m/s

Final – 31 MayWind:+1.5 m/s

400 metres

Heats – 29 May

Final – 30 May

800 metres
29 May

1500 metres
30 May

5000 metres
29 May

10,000 metres
31 May

110 metres hurdles
31 MayWind: +0.2 m/s

400 metres hurdles
30 May

3000 metres steeplechase
30 May

4 × 100 meters relay
31 May

4 × 400 meters relay
31 May

High jump
31 May

Pole vault
30 May

Long jump
29 May

Shot put
29 May

Discus throw
30 May

Javelin throw
31 May

Women's results

100 metres
29 MayWind: -1.1 m/s

200 metres

Heats – 30 JuneWind:Heat 1: -0.2 m/s, Heat 2: +0.4 m/s

Final – 31 MayWind:+0.0 m/s

400 metres
30 May

800 metres
29 May

1500 metres
30 May

5000 metres
29 May

10,000 metres
31 May

100 metres hurdles
31 MayWind: +0.7 m/s

400 metres hurdles
30 May

4 × 100 meters relay
31 May

4 × 400 meters relay
31 May

High jump
29 May

Pole vault
29 May

Long jump
30 May

Triple jump
31 May

Shot put
30 May

Javelin throw
29 May

References

External links
Results book

Athletics
2019
Games of the Small States of Europe
2019
Sport in Bar, Montenegro